Igor Georgievich Vishnevetsky (born 5 January 1964) is a Russian-born poet, novelist, screenwriter, and editor. He has been a contributor and editor in numerous literary journals, anthologies, and scholarly periodicals since the 1980s. Some of his work has been published in English, including a translated version of his first novel, Leningrad (2010).

Biography 
Igor Vishnevetsky was born in Rostov-on-Don in 1964 to Georgiy and Alla Vishnevetsky. Vishnevetsky originally aspired to become a composer.  He studied piano performance in school and audited music theory courses at Rostov State Rachmaninoff Conservatory before attending Moscow State University to pursue a degree in philology. After graduating in 1986, Vishnevetsky became an active member of the poetry and art scenes in Moscow and St. Petersburg prior to the break-up of the Soviet Union.

Vishnevetsky emigrated to the United States in 1992. Since that time his creative work has been done chiefly in North America.

In 1996 he received a Ph.D. in Russian Literature from the Department of Slavic Languages of Brown University. Subsequently, he taught at Emory University for five years. In the 2000s, he has also become a notable music historian, and is considered an authority on Sergei Prokofiev and the Russian-American composer Vladimir Dukelsky.

He also was a visiting professor of Russian and Film at Carnegie Mellon University. During this time, he wrote his experimental novel Leningrad which describes the dehumanizing effects of the Finno-German siege of the city during World War II and deals with transformation of former Russian capital into a Soviet city. Praised for its insights into the minds of the people who experienced the collapse of everything associated with humanity, Leningrad won a 2010 award for the best fiction published in Russia's leading literary periodical Novyi mir.  In 2012 it won a prestigious "New Verbal Art (Novaya Slovesnost', or NoS)" literary award.

Since 2010 he had been working on a film version of Leningrad.  The film was completed in 2014 (a slightly shorter version in 2015) and received a number of awards. Film historian and critic Andrei Plakhov called it "an absolutely amazing experiment,", while film critic Evgeny Maisel considered Visnevetsky's film "a true challenge to contemporary professional film production." Since 2018 he teaches English and Russian literature at the Franciscan University of Steubenville.

Vishnevetsky is an Eastern Orthodox Christian. His son is film critic Ignatiy Vishnevetsky.

Bibliography

Collected poetry 

   Poems (Stikhotvoreniya). Moscow: ALVA-XXI, 1992. 42 pp.
   Threefold Vision (Troynoe zrenie).  New York: Slovo/Word, 1997. 88 pp.
   Air Mail: Poems 1996-2001 (Vozdushnaya pochta: Stikhi 1996—2001). Moscow: Novoe literaturnoe obozrenie, 2001. 96 pp. 
   West of the Sun (Na zapad solntsa). Moscow: Nauka; Russkiy Gulliver, 2006. 278 pp. 
   First Snow (Pervosnezhye). Moscow: Russkiy Gulliver, 2008. 76 pp. 
   Rhymologion (Stikhoslov). Moscow: Ikar, 2008. 126 pp. 
   Collected Poems 2002-2020 (Sobranie strikhotvorenii 2002-2020). Moscow: Novoe literaturnoe obozrenie, 2021. 308 pp.

Fiction 

   Leningrad: povest'. Moscow: Vremya, 2012. 160 pp. 
   Leningrad: A novel. Translated by Andrew Bromfield. Champaign - London - Dublin: Dalkey Archive Press, 2013. 124 pp. 
   Leningrad. Translated into Macedonian by Мirjana Naumovski. Skopje: Bata pres, 2014. 154 pp. 
   Non-Elective Affinities (Neizbiratelinoe srodstvo[: сollected prose – novels Leningrad (2009), Islands in the Lagoon / Ostrova v lagune (2012), Non-Elective Affinities / Neizbiratelinoe srodstvo (2013-2017), short fiction Poet Who Was Not Forgotten / Nezabytyi poet (2012)]). Moscow: EKSMO, 2018. 384 pp.  
   Leningrad. Traduzione a cura di Daniela Rizzi e Luisa Ruvoletto. Venezia: Libreria Editrice Cafoscarina, 2019. 216 pp.

Academic works (selected) 

   Tragic Subject in Action: Andrei Bely (Tragicheskiy sub'yekt v deystvii: Andrey Belyi). Frankfurt am Main: Peter Lang, 2000. 214 pp. 
   Sergei Solovyov as a Historian of Philosophy and Culture. In S. M. Solovyov. Vladimir Solovyov: His Life and Creative Evolution. Vol. 1 (Fairfax, Va.: Eastern Christian Publications, 2001): IX-XXII. 
   Andrei Bely and Sergei Solovyov in Dictionary of Literary Biography, vol. 295 (Thomson/Gale, 2004): 63-80, 369-376. 
   The "Eurasianist Tendency" in the Music of the 1920s and 1930s («Evraziyskoe uklonenie» v muzyke 1920-kh -1930-kh godov). Moscow: Novoe literaturnoe obozrenie, 2005. 512 pp. 
   Sergei Prokofiev (Sergey Prokof'ev). Moscow: Molodaya gvardiya, 2009. 704 pp. 
   Arseny Tarkovsky in Dictionary of Literary Biography, vol. 359 (Gale, 2011): 265-280. 
   The Literary Fate of Vasiliy Kondrat'ev (Literaturnaya sud'ba Vasiliya Konrdat'eva),  Novoe literaturnoe obozrenie, 3/157 (2019): 239-267 
   Three Contemporary Russian Poets and Biblical Tradition: Sergey Zavyalov, Natalia Chernykh, Jaan Kaplinski, Religions, 11/13 (2022)

Filmography 
Leningrad (2015)

References

External links

1964 births
Living people
20th-century Eastern Orthodox Christians
20th-century Russian male writers
20th-century Russian poets
21st-century Eastern Orthodox Christians
21st-century Russian poets
21st-century Russian writers
Brown University alumni
Carnegie Mellon University faculty
Emory University faculty
Franciscan University of Steubenville faculty
Male biographers
Moscow State University alumni
Writers from Rostov-on-Don
Russian Orthodox Christians from Russia
Russian biographers
Russian emigrants to the United States
Russian male novelists
Russian male poets
Russian professors